Renu Dahal is a Nepalese politician and current Mayor of Bharatpur Metropolitan City. She joined the CPN (Maoist Centre) party in 1994 and became full timer member of the party in 1996. Dahal is a daughter of the incumbent Prime Minister and chairman of CPN (MC), Pushpa Kamal Dahal. She was the member (Proportional Representation) of First Constituent Assembly of Nepal.

Early life
Renu Dahal was born on July 4, 1976 in Bhimsen Nagar of Shivanagar VDC (Now Bharatpur Metropolis) in Chitwan District. She is the second daughter of Pushpa Kamal Dahal (née Prachanda) and Sita Dahal. Dahal has one younger sister, Ganga. Her eldest sister, Gyanu, who died in 2014 and brother, Prakash, who died in 2017.

CA election

2013 Constituent Assembly election

2017 Bharatpur municipal election

2017 election 
She was elected as a Mayor of Bharatpur Metropolitan city on August 5, 2017. She secured the Mayoral post by defeating her closet rival of Communist Party of Nepal (UML), Devi Gyawali. Her victory margin was only 203 vote as she polled 43,127 votes to defeat Gyawali 42,924 votes.

2022 Bharatpur municipal elections 

CPN (Maoist Centre) had given ticket to Renu Dahal, the daughter of Pushpa Kamal Dahal as mayoral candidate in Bharatpur.

Pushpa Kamal Dahal gave a threat while speaking in a election centric program in Bharapur. He told country would plunge into a disaster if Nepali Congress supporters don't vote for Maoist’s election symbol in Bharatpur. Dahal in speech added "Let me warn you that if the NC supporters did not vote for the Maoist candidate in Bharatpur this time, possibilities are that the country would plunge into an accident.”

This speech was highly criticized within and outside Dahal's party. Ganesh Sah, a senior politician of CPN (Maoist Centre) told there was no practice of collective leadership in party and people are well known why Prachanda is much concerned only on Bharatpur. Even party senior leaders including Anjana Bisankhe, Indra Bahadur Angbo criticized hyper activeness of chair Prachanda only in Bharatpur being his and his daughter's constituency.

Similarly, Nepali Congress leader Jagannath Paudel who stepped as independent mayoral candidate told his win was secure by the speech of Prachanda and no alliance can stop him from win while it's predicted that even would internally support Paudel against Dahal.

2022 election

See also
 Bijay Subedi
 Jagannath Paudel

References

External links
 
 Official website of Bharatpur Metropolis

1976 births
Living people
Nepalese communists
21st-century Nepalese women politicians
21st-century Nepalese politicians
People from Bharatpur, Nepal
Children of prime ministers of Nepal
Mayors of places in Nepal
People from Chitwan District
Members of the 1st Nepalese Constituent Assembly